The 1992 Houston Cougars football team, also known as the Houston Cougars, Houston, or UH, represented the University of Houston during the 1992 NCAA Division I-A football season. The team was led by third-year head coach John Jenkins and played their home games at the Astrodome in Houston, Texas. They competed as members of the Southwest Conference, finishing tied for sixth.

Schedule

Sources:

Personnel

References

Houston
Houston Cougars football seasons
Houston Cougars football